Mad Cat may refer to:

 M.A.D. Cat, Dr Claw's pet in the TV series Inspector Gadget
 Mad Catz, a third-party video game accessory maker
 Madcat, a video game live streaming platform, renamed Trovo